Lee So-yeon or Soyeon Lee, also romanized as Yi So-yeon, may refer to:
 Lee So-yeon (actress) (born 1982), South Korean actress
 Lee So-yeon (judoka) (born 1981), South Korean judoka
 Lee So-yeon (short track speed skater) (born 1993), South Korean short track speed skater, active between 2012 and 2017
 Lee So-yeon (speed skater) (born 1985), South Korean long track speed skater, active between 2001 and 2010
 Soyeon Kate Lee (born 1979), Korean-American pianist
 Yi So-Yeon (born 1978), South Korean astronaut

See also 
 Soo Yeon Lee (born 1984), South Korean table tennis player